The Iowa State Cyclones men's golf team represents Iowa State University (ISU) and competes in the Big 12 Conference of NCAA Division I. The team is coached by Andrew Tank, he is in his 7th year at Iowa State.  The Cyclones play their home meets at Veenker Memorial Golf Course on Iowa State's campus.

History

The Iowa State men's golf team first got it start in 1923 in the Missouri Valley Intercollegiate Athletic Association conference.  After three years the MVIAA dropped men's golf as a sponsored sport.  When the Big Six sponsored golf in 1935, Iowa State joined once again.  The early Cyclone squad were led by Coach Hugo Otopalik who split his time between Iowa State golf and wrestling.  As a pioneer in the field of collegiate golf, OtopaliK was tournament director at the first NCAA golf championship held at the Wakonda Country Club in Des Moines in 1939 and was the first chairman of the NCAA golf committee.  His best squads were headlined by brothers Billy and Max Hall; culminating with Big Six conference titles for Billy and Max in 1939 and 1941 respectively and a seventh-place finish in the 1940 NCAA Championship.

After struggling to find success for almost half a century the Cyclones were able to reach the NCAA Regionals in seven out of nine years from 1991 to 1999.  Several of those 1990s were led by Jason Knutzon who would go on to play in both the U.S. Open and The Open Championship.

Under current head coach, Andrew Tank, Iowa State is experiencing success both individually and as a team.  Nate McCoy finished tied for 29th at the 2012 NCAA Championship, the highest individual finish in program history.  In 2014 the team would reach the NCAA Finals for the first time in over 50 years, they finished tied for 25th

Record

Individual honors

Veenker Memorial Golf Course

Named for George F. Veenker, head football coach at Iowa State from 1931 to 1936.  He was also Athletic Director from 1933 until 1945.  The golf course was completed in 1938 and given its current name in 1959.

The 6,543-yard, par-72, George Veenker Memorial Golf Course is located just two blocks north of the Iowa State campus.  The 18-hole course was constructed in 1938 from the design of world-renowned golf course architect, Perry Maxwell (re-designer of the seventh and 10th holes at Augusta National Golf Club in 1937).  The golf course was built with WPA and Athletic Council funds, and cost $122,373. The course hosted the conference championships in 1982 and 1989, two regional AIAW championships, and hosts the annual Iowa Masters Championship.  It also hosted the 1949 NCAA national championship, in which Arnold Palmer was a participant.

The team practices at the newly opened $2 million Golf Performance Center located three miles from campus.  The 16-acre facility was designed by world renowned architech Keith Foster to be used exclusively by the Iowa State men's and women's golf team.

References

External links
 Veenker Memorial Golf Course